Television is a telecommunication medium used for transmitting and receiving moving images and sound.

Television may also refer to:

 Television program
 Television set
 The whole area of television, for example as an art form, or as an engineering discipline.

Music
 Television (band), an American rock band

Albums
 Television (Television album), 1992
 Television (Dr. John album), 1994
 Television (Baaba Maal album), 2009

Singles and songs
 "Television" (Dave Edmunds song), a 1978 single from Tracks on Wax 4
 "Television" (The Verve Pipe song), a 1999 single from The Verve Pipe
 "Television", a song by Hard-Fi from Once Upon a Time in the West
 "Television", a song by Stabbing Westward from their self-titled album
 "Television", a song by Sunny Day Real Estate from The Rising Tide
 "Television", a song by Idles from Joy as an Act of Resistance

Films
 Television (2012 film), a 2012 Bengali film
 Television (1931 film), a 1931 American comedy film

See also
Television set (disambiguation)
TV (disambiguation)